The 2019 Skate Canada International was the second event of the 2019–20 ISU Grand Prix of Figure Skating, a senior-level international invitational competition series. It was held at Prospera Place in Kelowna, British Columbia from October 25 to 27. Medals were awarded in the disciplines of men's singles, ladies' singles, pair skating, and ice dance. Skaters earned points toward qualifying for the 2019–20 Grand Prix Final.

Entries
The ISU announced the preliminary assignments on June 20, 2019.

Changes to preliminary assignments

Records

The following new ISU best scores were set during this competition:

Results

Men

Ladies

Pairs

Ice dance

References

Skate Canada International
2019 in figure skating
2019 in Canadian sports
Skate Canada International